Matteo Ciofani (born 26 February 1988) is an Italian footballer who plays as a defender for  club Triestina.

Club career
Born in Avezzano, Abruzzo, Ciofani started his professional career at local side Pescara.

Ciofani made his Serie B debut on 5 May 2007. He started a match that ended in 3–2 in a loss to Crotone. He followed the team towards relegated to Serie C1 and was subsequently loaned out to Serie D side Bitonto in January 2008.

In the summer of 2008, Ciofani left for Serie D side RC Angolana.  He made 32 league appearances for the Serie D side and then signed for Serie B side Ascoli in June 2009.

On 1 November 2012, Serie B side Ternana announced they had signed Ciofani until June 2013.

On 16 August 2018, Ciofani signed with Serie B team Pescara.

On 29 January 2020, he moved to Serie C club Bari.

On 1 July 2021, he signed a two-year contract with Modena.

On 24 August 2022, Ciofani moved to Triestina on a two-year contract.

Personal life
Matteo Ciofani's brother, Daniel is also a professional footballer, and was his teammate at Frosinone between 2013 and 2018.

Career statistics

Club

References

External links
 
 Profile at Football.it  
 Profile at La Gazzetta dello Sport  

1988 births
Living people
People from Avezzano
Footballers from Abruzzo
Italian footballers
Association football fullbacks
Serie A players
Serie B players
Serie C players
Serie D players
Modena F.C. players
Delfino Pescara 1936 players
Ascoli Calcio 1898 F.C. players
Ternana Calcio players
Frosinone Calcio players
S.S.C. Bari players
U.S. Triestina Calcio 1918 players
Sportspeople from the Province of L'Aquila